The Symphony No. 26 in E major, K. 184/161a, was written by Wolfgang Amadeus Mozart and completed on March 30, 1773, one month after he returned from his third Italian tour.

The symphony has the scoring of two flutes, two oboes, two bassoons, two horns, two trumpets and strings.

It has the following 3 movements, all of which are attached:

Molto presto, 
Andante in C minor, 
Allegro,

External links

References

26
1773 compositions
Compositions in E-flat major